Dmytrivka is a village in Shakhtarsk Raion, a part of Donetsk Oblast within Ukraine.

Population
According to the 2001 census, the population of the village was 3,370. 91.72% of the village said that Ukrainian was their native language, 8.13% said that it was Russian, and 0.15% said that it was Belarusian.

References

Villages in Horlivka Raion
Don Host Oblast